Bathyporeiidae is a family of amphipods in the order Amphipoda. There are two genera in Bathyporeiidae:
 Amphiporeia Shoemaker, 1929
 Bathyporeia Lindström, 1855

References

Further reading

 
 
 
 
 
 
 
 
 
 
 
 

Amphipoda
Crustacean families